is a Japanese manga series written and illustrated by Shizuka Itō. It was serialized in Shogakukan's seinen manga magazine Monthly Big Comic Spirits from August 2009 to January 2014, with its chapters collected in three tankōbon volumes. Another manga, Misoji Meshi Niku, was serialized in Monthly Big Comic Spirits from May 2018 to June 2019, with its chapters collected in two tankōbon volumes.

Publication
Shogakukan collected its chapters in three tankōbon volumes, released from February 12, 2016, to December 12, 2017.

Another series, titled , was serialized in Monthly Big Comic Spirits from May 26, 2018, to June 27, 2019. Two volumes were released on December 27, 2018, and July 30, 2019.

Volume list

Misoji Meshi

Misoji Meshi Niku

References

Further reading

External links
 
 

Cooking in anime and manga
Seinen manga
Shogakukan manga